Georges Dupont (14 May 1903 – 5 April 1983) was a French sprinter. He competed in the men's 400 metres at the 1928 Summer Olympics.

References

1903 births
1983 deaths
Athletes (track and field) at the 1928 Summer Olympics
French male sprinters
Olympic athletes of France
Place of birth missing